Alfath Fathier (born 28 May 1996) is an Indonesian professional footballer who plays for Liga 1 club Persis Solo. Mainly a left back, he can also play as a winger or a right back.

International career 
He made his debut with Indonesia on 10 October 2018 in a friendly against Myanmar, and Fathier scored his first international goal for Indonesia in a match against Timor-Leste in the 2018 AFF Championship.

Career statistics

Club

International

International goals
Scores and results list Indonesia's goal tally first.

Honours

Club 
Persija Jakarta
 Menpora Cup: 2021

Individual 
Liga 1 Best Eleven: 2018

References

External links

 

1996 births
Living people
Liga 1 (Indonesia) players
Liga 2 (Indonesia) players
Persiba Balikpapan players
Madura United F.C. players
Persija Jakarta players
Persis Solo players
PS Barito Putera players
People from Purwakarta Regency
Sportspeople from West Java
Indonesia international footballers
Association football wing halves
Indonesian footballers
21st-century Indonesian people